Syed Asghar Ali Shah (born 3 October 1978), also known as Asghar Ali Shah, is a Pakistani boxer. He represented Pakistan at the 2000 and 2004 Summer Olympics.

References

External links
 
 

1978 births
Living people
Pakistani male boxers
Olympic boxers of Pakistan
Boxers at the 2000 Summer Olympics
Boxers at the 2004 Summer Olympics
Asian Games medalists in boxing
Asian Games silver medalists for Pakistan
Boxers at the 1998 Asian Games
Boxers at the 2002 Asian Games
Boxers at the 2006 Asian Games
Medalists at the 2002 Asian Games
Lightweight boxers
Commonwealth Games medallists in boxing
Commonwealth Games silver medallists for Pakistan
Boxers at the 1998 Commonwealth Games
21st-century Pakistani people
Medallists at the 1998 Commonwealth Games